Joyceville is a community in Ontario, located within the rural part of Kingston.

Neighbourhoods in Kingston, Ontario